is a Japanese badminton player. She graduated from Futaba Mirai School. She was the girls' singles bronze medalist at the 2017 Asian Junior Championships. Mizui participated at the 2018 Summer Youth Olympics in Buenos Aires, Argentina. She won the bronze medal in the mixed badminton team event.

Achievements

Asian Junior Championships 
Girls' singles

BWF International Challenge/Series (2 titles, 4 runners-up) 
Women's singles

  BWF International Challenge tournament
  BWF International Series tournament
  BWF Future Series tournament

References

External links 
 

2000 births
Living people
Sportspeople from Nara Prefecture
Japanese female badminton players
Badminton players at the 2018 Summer Youth Olympics